Sekolah Menegah Atas 1 Wonosari is the oldest high school in Wonosari, Gunungkidul Regency. It was established in 1962.

Schools in Indonesia
Education in the Special Region of Yogyakarta